Novskoye is a rural locality (a village) in Vtorovskoye Rural Settlement, Kameshkovsky District, Vladimir Oblast, Russia. The population was 44 as of 2010.

Geography 
Novskoye is located 30 km southwest of Kameshkovo (the district's administrative centre) by road. Davydovo is the nearest rural locality.

References 

Rural localities in Kameshkovsky District